Sanjay Chauhan may refer to:

 Sanjay Chauhan (politician), mayor of Shimla Municipal Corporation
 Sanjay Chauhan (screenwriter) (1962–2022), Indian screenwriter
 Sanjay Chauhan (cricketer) (born 1966), Indian businessman and cricketer
 Sanjay Singh Chauhan (1961–2014), Gujjar leader
 Sanjay Puran Singh Chauhan (born 1975), Indian film director and screenwriter
 Sanjay Chauhan (soldier), Indian military captain who participated in 1994 Operation Rakshak
 Lieutenant General Sanjay Chauhan, see List of serving generals of the Indian Army

See also
 Sanjay (disambiguation)
 Chauhan